Elections in Madhya Pradesh, a state in India are conducted in accordance with the Constitution of India. The Assembly of Madhya Pradesh creates laws regarding the conduct of local body elections unilaterally while any changes by the state legislature to the conduct of state level elections need to be approved by the Parliament of India. In addition, the state legislature may be dismissed by the Parliament according to Article 356 of the Indian Constitution and President's rule may be imposed.

Main Political Parties Over The Years

While some parties are currently active in the politics of Madhya Pradesh, some have been dissolved.

Lok Sabha Elections

From 1989 to 2000
Total Seats- 40

After 2000
Total Seats- 29

Vidhan Sabha elections

After 2000
Total Seats- 230

References

External links
Election Commission of India